English Eccentrics and Eccentricities was written by John Timbs and published first in two volumes by Richard Bentley in New Burlington Street, London, in 1866. It remains both entertaining light reading and a source of biographical incident, sometimes rarely repeated on unusual people of the late 18th and early 19th century, from celebrities to recluses, religious notables to country astrologers, pop authors to tragedians.

As Timbs lays out his purpose in his preface:

, a few words before we introduce you to our . They may be odd company: yet, how often do we find eccentricity in the minds of persons of good understanding. Their sayings and doings, it is true, may not rank as high among the delicacies of intellectual epicures as the Strasburg pies among the dishes described in the Almanach des Gourmands; but they possess attractions in proportion to the degree in which 'man favours wonders.' Swift has remarked, that 'a little grain of the romance is no ill ingredient to preserve and exalt the dignity of human nature, without which it is apt to degenerate into everything that is sordid, vicious, and low.' Into the latter extremes Eccentricity is occasionally apt to run, somewhat like certain fermenting liquors which cannot be checked in their acidifying courses.

Into such headlong excesses our Eccentrics rarely stray; and one of our objects in sketching their ways, is to show that with oddity of character may co-exist much goodness of heart; and your strange fellow, though, according to the lexicographer, he be outlandish, odd, queer, and eccentric, may possess claims to our notice which the man who is ever studying the fitness of things would not so readily present.

Many books of character have been published which have recorded the acts, sayings, and fortunes of Eccentrics. The instances in the present Work are, for the most part, drawn from our own time, so as to present points of novelty which could not so reasonably be expected in portraits of older date. They are motley-minded and grotesque in many instances; and from their rare accidents may be gathered many a lesson of thrift, as well as many a scene of humour to laugh at; while some realize the well remembered couplet on the near alliance of wits to madness.

It should be added, that in the preparation of this Work, the Author has availed himself of the most trustworthy materials for the staple of his narratives, which, in certain cases, he has preferred giving ipsissimis verbis of his authorities to "re-writing" them, as it is termed; a process which rarely adds to the veracity of story-telling, but, on the other hand, often gives a colour to the incidents which the original narrator never intended to convey. The object has been to render the book truthful as well as entertaining.

Volume One
The Beckfords and Fonthill
Alderman Beckford's Monument Speech, in Guildhall
Beau Brummel 
Sir Lumley Skeffington, Bart
"Romeo" Coates 
Abraham Newland
The Spendthrift Squire of Halston, John Mytton
Lord Petersham
The King and Queen of the Sandwich Islands
Sir Edward Bering's Luckless Courtship
Gretna Green Marriages  
The Agapemone, or Abode of Love 
Singular Scotch Ladies 
Mrs. Bond, of Hackney 
John Ward, the Hackney Miser 
"Poor Man of Mutton" 
Lord Kenyon's Parsimony
Mary Moser, the Flower-painter 
The Eccentric Miss Banks 
Thomas Cooke, the Miser, of Pentonville
Thomas Cooke, the Turkey Merchant
"Lady Lewson," of Clerkenwell 
Profits of Dust-sifting and Dust-heaps 
Sir John Dineley, Bart. 
The Rothschilds 
A Legacy of Half-a-million of Money 
Eccentricities of the Earl of Bridgewater
The Denisons, and the Conyngham Family
"Dog Jennings"
Baron Ward's Remarkable Career
A Costly House-warming
Devonshire Eccentrics 
Hannah Snell, the Female Soldier
Lady Archer 
Modem Alchemists 
Jack Adams, the Astrologer 
The Woman-hating Cavendish 
Modern Astrology "Witch Pickles" 
Hannah Green; or, "Ling Bob" 
Oddities of Lady Hester Stanhope—primarily her beliefs in her place in prophecy and her peculiar form of astrology
Hermits and Eremitical Life
The Recluses of Llangollen
Snuff-taking Legacies
Burial Bequests 
Burials on Box Hill and Leith Hill
 Peter Labilliere
 Richard Hull
Jeremy Bentham's Bequest of his Remains
The Marquis of Anglesey's Leg 
The Cottle Church
Horace Walpole's Chattels saved by a Talisman — believed to be the polished black coal scrying mirror of Dr. Dee
Norwood Gipsies 
"Cunning Mary," of Clerkenwell 
"Jerusalem Whalley " 
Father Mathew and the Temperance Movement
Eccentric Preachers 
Irving a Millenarian
A Trio of Fanatics 
The Spenceans 
Joanna Southcote, and the Coming of Shiloh
The Founder of Mormonism
Huntington, the Preacher 
Amen Peter Isnell  
Strangely Eccentric, yet Sane 
Strange Hallucination 
"Corner Memory Thompson " 
Mummy of a Manchester Lady 
Hypochondriasis 
"The Wonder of all the Wonders that the World ever wondered at" 
"The Princess Caraboo" 
Fat Folks. Lambert and Bright
A Cure for Corpulence
Epitaphs on Fat Folks
Count Boruwlaski, the Polish Dwarf
The Irish Giant 
Birth Extraordinary
William Button's "Strong Woman"
Wildman and his Bees
Lord Stowell's Love of Sight-seeing
John Day and Fairlop Fair
A Princely Hoax

Volume Two

Strange Sights and Sporting Scenes
Sir John Waters's Escape 
Colonel Mackinnon's Practical Joking  
A Gourmand Physician 
Dick England, the Gambler 
Brighton Races, Thirty Years since 
Colonel Hellish 
Doncaster Eccentrics  
"Walking Stewart" 
Youthful Days of the Hon. Grantley Berkeley
What became of the Seven Dials 
An Old Bailey Character 
Bone and Shell Exhibition   
"Quid Eides? " 
"Bolton Trotters " 
Eccentric Lord Coleraine
Eccentric Travellers  
Elegy on a Geologist

Artists
Gilray and his Caricatures
William Blake, Painter and Poet  
Nollekens, the Sculptor 
The Young Roscius  
Hardham's "No. 37"  
Rare Criticism  
The O. P. Riot  
Origin of "Paul Pry"  
Mrs. Garrick 
Mathews, a Spanish Ambassador  
Grimaldi, the Clown  
Munden's Last Performance  
Oddities of Dowton  
Liston in Tragedy  
Boyhood of Edmund Kean
A Mysterious Parcel  
Masquerade Incident 
Mr. T. P. Cooke in Melodrama and Pantomime 
"Romeo and Juliet" in America 
The Mulberries, a Shakspearian Club  
Colley Cibber's Daughter  
An Eccentric Love-passage  
True to the Text 
Monk Lewis 
Person's Eccentricities 
Parriana: Oddities of Dr. Parr  
Oddities of John Horne Tooke  
Mr. Canning's Humour  
Peter Pindar. Dr. Wolcot  
The Author of "Dr. Syntax "
Mrs. Radcliffe and the Critics  
Cool Sir James Mackintosh  
Eccentricities of Cobbett  
Heber, the Book-collector  
Sir John Soane lampooned  
Extraordinary Calculators
Charles Lamb's Cottage at Islington
Thomas Hood
A Witty Archbishop
Literary Madmen
A Perpetual-motion Seeker
The Romantic Duchess of Newcastle
Sources of Laughter
Busby's Folly and Bull Feather Hall
Old Islington Taverns
The Oyster and Parched-pea Club
A Manchester Punch-house
"The Blue Key"
Brandy in Tea
"The Wooden Spoon"
A Tipsy Village
What an Epicure eats in his Life-time
Epitaph on Dr. Maginn
Greenwich Dinners
Lord Pembroke's Port Wine
A Tremendous Bowl of Punch
Long Sir Thomas Robinson
Lord Chesterfield's Will
An Odd Family
An Eccentric Host
Quackery Successful
The Grateful Footpad
A Notoriety of the Temple
A Ride in a Sedan
Mr. John Scott (Lord Eldon) in Parliament
A Chancery Jeu-d'Esprit
Hanging by Compact
The Ambassador Floored
"The Dutch Mail"
Bad Spelling
A "Single Conspirator"
A Miscalculation
An Indiscriminate Collector
The Bishop's Saturday Night
"Rather than otherwise"
Classic Soup Distribution
Alphabet Single Rhymed
Non Sequitur and Therefore

External links
 English Eccentrics and Eccentricities on the Internet Archive
 English Eccentrics and Eccentricities, Vol 1, download text and images (various formats)
 English Eccentrics and Eccentricities, Vol 2, download text and images (various formats)

1866 books
Biographical dictionaries by topic
Eccentricity (behavior)